"Spellbound" was one of four songs Maltese singer Ira Losco sung in Malta Song For Europe 2001. It was written by Gerard James Borg and composed by Philip Vella.

2001 singles
Songs with music by Philip Vella
Songs with lyrics by Gerard James Borg
2001 songs